This is a list of flag bearers who have represented Australasia at the Olympics.

Flag bearers carry the national flag of their country at the opening ceremony of the Olympic Games.

See also
Australasia at the Olympics
List of flag bearers for Australia at the Olympics
List of flag bearers for New Zealand at the Olympics

References

Australasia
+
Olympic flagbearers
lagbearers
lagbearers